Thomas McElveen (born February 17, 1978) is a South Carolina state senator, representing the 35th district. He is a member of the Democratic Party.

Personal life and education
McElveen earned a bachelor's degree from Davidson College in 2000 and a JD from the University of South Carolina in 2003. McElveen's father, Joe McElveen, is the mayor of Sumter, South Carolina.

Career
McElveen served as both a prosecutor and public defender for Sumter County. He was elected to the South Carolina Senate in 2012. McElveen serves on the Agriculture and Natural Resources, Corrections and Penology, Fish, Game and Forestry, Judiciary, and Rules committees.

References

External links
Twitter account

1978 births
Living people
People from Sumter, South Carolina
Davidson College alumni
University of South Carolina School of Law alumni
South Carolina lawyers
Democratic Party South Carolina state senators
Public defenders
21st-century American politicians